The 1970 Richmond Spiders football team was an American football team that represented the University of Richmond as a member of the Southern Conference (SoCon) during the 1970 NCAA University Division football season. In their fifth season under head coach Frank Jones, Richmond compiled a 4–6 record, with a mark of 3–3 in conference play, finishing finishing fifth in the SoCon.

Schedule

References

Richmond
Richmond Spiders football seasons
Richmond Spiders